Brandan Andrew Craig (born April 7, 2004) is an American professional soccer player who plays as a defender and defensive midfielder for the Philadelphia Union of Major League Soccer.

Club career

Philadelphia Union II
Craig spent four years for the Philadelphia Union Academy and played with the Academy’s U-12, U-13, U-14, U-15, U-16/17 and U-18/19 squads. He made his league debut for the club on 22 July 2020, coming on as a halftime substitute for Issa Rayyan in a 5–1 home defeat to New York Red Bulls II.

Philadelphia Union
On January 1, 2021, Craig officially joined Philadelphia Union's MLS roster.

Honors
United States U20
CONCACAF U-20 Championship: 2022

References

External links
Brandan Craig at US Soccer Development Academy

2004 births
Living people
Philadelphia Union II players
Philadelphia Union players
USL Championship players
American soccer players
United States men's youth international soccer players
Association football defenders
Soccer players from Pennsylvania
Homegrown Players (MLS)
MLS Next Pro players
Major League Soccer players
United States men's under-20 international soccer players